Damien Fitzhenry (born 5 July 1974) is an Irish retired hurler. His league and championship career with the Wexford senior team spanned eighteen seasons from 1993 until 2010.Fitzhenry is widely regarded as Wexford's greatest ever goalkeeper.

Playing career

Club

The Fitzhenry name has been associated with the Duffry Rovers club since the 1970s.  Damien, the youngest of fifteen children, currently plays his club hurling and football with 'the Rovers' and is following in the footsteps of his brothers Mark, Tom, Séamus, John, Martin, Gerard, Noel, Paddy and Fran.  As well as that three of Fitzhenry's sisters, Tina, Mary and Ann, have also played camogie with Duffry Rovers.  Fitzhenry joined the senior ranks of the club in late 1991 and shared in the club's famous run of seven county football titles in-a-row between 1986 and 1992.

Inter-county

Fitzhenry first came to prominence in the early 1992 when he joined the Wexford minor hurling panel.  He quickly moved onto the under-21 panel, however, he had little success in either of these grades.  

In early 1993 Fitzhenry made his senior debut in the National Hurling League quarter-final against Westmeath.  Wexford went on to reach the National League final that year.  The opponents on that occasion were Cork, however, the game ended in a draw.  The replay saw extra-time being played, however, both sides ended level once again.  At the third attempt Cork emerged victorious by 3–11 to 1–12.  In spite of this defeat expectations were still high for the Leinster championship.  In the final of that competition Wexford drew with arch rivals and All-Ireland champions Kilkenny and there was hope of success.  The replay was a different affair as Kilkenny won handily enough by 2–12 to 0–11.

Wexford were defeated in the Leinster final again in 1994 before disappearing from the championship at the first hurdle in 1995.  By 1996 things were beginning to change in Wexford, thanks in no small way to the new manager Liam Griffin.  Once again Fitzhenry lined out in goals in the Leinster final.  Offaly provided the opposition on that occasion; however, history was made as Wexford won by 2–23 to 2–15.  It was Fitzhenry's first senior Leinster title and Wexford's first since 1977.  Wexford later defeated Galway in the penultimate game of the championship, setting up an All-Ireland final meeting with Limerick.  The Munster men were slight favourites going into the game.  They were the beaten finalists of 1994 and had already beaten Clare, the reigning champions, in the Munster Championship.  The game was far from a classic; however, it did provide excitement.  Tom Dempsey was the hero of the day as he scored a goal after nineteen minutes to give Wexford a major advantage.  His side led by 1–8 to 0–10 at half-time in spite of having Éamonn Scallon sent off.  Wexford took a four-point lead in the second-half; however, this was whittled back to two points as Wexford hung on for the last twenty minutes.  The final score of 1–13 to 0–14 showed how vital Dempsey's goal was.  It was Fitzhenry's first All-Ireland medal and Wexford's first since 1968.

In 1997 Fitzhenry captured a second Leinster title as Wexford defeated their age old rivals Kilkenny.  A 2–14 to 1–11 victory secured a safe passage to the All-Ireland semi-final where Tipperary, the defeated Munster finalists, provided the opposition.  Wexford, however, surrendered their All-Ireland crown on that occasion as Tipp won the game.  In spite of this defeat Fitzhenry was recognised as the best goalkeeper of the championship and was presented with his first All-Star award.  

The departure of Liam Griffin as manager resulted in a downturn in Wexford's fortunes.  Offally and Kilkenny monopolised the Leinster final for the next three years from 1998 until 2000.  Fitzhenry's side were back in the provincial final in 2001, however, a 2–19 to 0–12 defeat by Kilkenny proved how off the pace the team were.  In spite of this the team reached the All-Ireland semi-final where they drew with Tipperary.  Tipp won the replay and went on to claim the All-Ireland title for the first time in a decade.  

Fitzhenry's side lost out to Kilkenny in the Leinster finals of 2002 and 2003, however, they ended up in the All-Ireland semi-final in the latter year.  In that game Wexford drew with Cork in an exciting challenge, however, Cork crushed Wexford in the replay.  

In 2004 Wexford faced Kilkenny in the Leinster semi-final.  While most people expected an easy victory for 'the Cats', Wexford sealed the win with a dramatic last-second goal resulting in a one-point victory.  Wexford later went on to defeat Offaly in the provincial final giving Fitzhenry his third Leinster medal.  This allowed Wexford to advance to the All-Ireland semi-final, however, Cork claimed the victory in the penultimate stage of the championship.  Once again, Fitzhenry was recognised as the best goalkeeper in the country and he was presented with a second All-Star award.

The following few years brought little success to Fitzhenry or Wexford.  Although the team suffered defeats in the Leinster championship they still made their way to the All-Ireland quarter-finals.

In 2007 Wexford lost the provincial final by double scores to Kilkenny, however, the team later shocked Tipperary in the All-Ireland quarter-final.  Fitzhenry scored a crucial goal in that game to secure the victory and set up an All-Ireland semi-final with Kilkenny.  Once again, 'the Cats' defeated the men from the Model County. Fitzhenry was later presented with a GPA All-Star. 

In 2008 Wexford had a poor start to the championship.  After drawing with Dublin, Fitzhenry's side faced Kilkenny in the provincial decider.  A trouncing on that occasion meant that Wexford had only one more chance left to remain in the championship.  An All-Ireland quarter-final meeting with Waterford, in spite of a great display by Fitzhenry, resulted in a 2–19 to 3–15 defeat.

Two days later there were rumours that Fitzhenry was thinking about retirement from inter-county hurling after 15 years on the panel though in January 2009 after the former Tippperary hurler Colm Bonnar was appointed as the manager two months ago. Fitzhenry returned to the panel but did not play until their championship opening against Offaly on 30 May where he made a few magnifciant saves including a penalty from Shane Dooley.  Fitzhenry and his squad were narrowly sent to the qualifiers after a one-point defeat by Dublin at Nowlan Park. Despite getting early knocked out Fitzhenry thought about giving the 2010 hurling championship another go.

Fitzhenry confirmed on 15 February 2010 his retirement from inter-county hurling after serving 17 years in the panel. He was succeeded as Wexford goalkeeper by Noel Carton.

References

Teams

1974 births
Living people
Duffry Rovers hurlers
Duffry Rovers Gaelic footballers
Wexford inter-county hurlers
Leinster inter-provincial hurlers
Hurling goalkeepers
Hurling selectors
Fitzhenry, Damian
People from Enniscorthy